The Securities Commission of the Bahamas (SCB), formerly the Securities Board of the Bahamas, is an agency responsible for regulating investment funds, securities, and capital markets in the Bahamas. Among other responsibilities, it enforces the Financial and Corporate Service Providers Act, the Digital Assets and Registered Exchanges (DARE) Act, and the Carbon Credits Trading Act. Its members are appointed by the Minister of Finance.

SCB was established in 1995 by the Securities Board Act, but its mandate is now provided for by the 2011 Securities Industry Act. Its offices are at Poinciana House on East Bay Street, Nassau.

Its executive director is Christina Rolle, who has served in this role since January 26, 2015. She was preceded by Hillary H. Deveaux, who served as interim executive director from September 11, 2013, until 2015.

The commission's chairs have included Timothy Donaldson and Tonya Bastian Galanis.

As of 2015, SCB oversaw more than 1,000 firms. That year, the commission accepted a two-year position as chair of the Caribbean Group of Securities Regulators.

See also
 Bahamas International Securities Exchange
 FTX (company)

References

External links
 

Financial regulatory authorities
The Bahamas
Government agencies established in 1995